Badminton at the 1989 Southeast Asian Games was held at Cheras Stadium and Stadium Negara, Kuala Lumpur, Malaysia. Events were conducted between 20 and 31 August. Final competitions were scheduled at Stadium Negara.

Medal summary

Medal table

Medalists

Results

Men's singles

Women's singles

Men's doubles

Women's doubles

Mixed doubles

References 
 

Badminton at the Southeast Asian Games
Badminton tournaments in Malaysia
1989 in badminton
1989 in Malaysian sport
Sport in Kuala Lumpur
International sports competitions hosted by Malaysia